Gillian "Jill" Slattery (born 25 May 1945) is a female retired British swimmer.

Swimming career
Slattery won a bronze medal in the 200 metres breaststroke at the 1966 European Aquatics Championships. She competed in the same event at the 1964 and 1968 Summer Olympics and finished fifth in 1964.

At the 1966 British Empire and Commonwealth Games she won a gold and a silver medal in the 220 yards and 110 yards breaststroke, respectively. At the ASA National British Championships she won the 110 yards breaststroke title in 1964 and the 220 yards breaststroke title in 1967 and 1968.

References

External links

1945 births
Living people
Sportspeople from Sheffield
Swimmers at the 1964 Summer Olympics
Swimmers at the 1968 Summer Olympics
Olympic swimmers of Great Britain
Female breaststroke swimmers
European Aquatics Championships medalists in swimming
English breaststroke swimmers
Commonwealth Games medallists in swimming
Commonwealth Games gold medallists for England
Commonwealth Games silver medallists for England
Swimmers at the 1966 British Empire and Commonwealth Games
Medallists at the 1966 British Empire and Commonwealth Games